Don't It Drag On is an album by American singer/songwriter Chris Smither, released in 1972. It was re-released on CD along with I'm a Stranger Too! in 2002.

Reception

Writing for Allmusic, critic Brett Hartenbach called Smither "a great writer who knows when to look elsewhere for material, a masterful guitarist who understands simplicity and a powerful singer with restraint.": and wrote of the album "while the bulk of Smither's material has a ruminative, melancholic tone, don't expect typical singer/songwriter fare." Village Voice critic Robert Christgau also praised the album, writing "Smither writes tough-minded yet numinous post-folk songs that do justice to his adventurous taste in other people's... A smart record."

Track listing
All songs by Chris Smither unless otherwise noted.
 "Lonesome Georgia Brown"
 "Down in the Flood" (Bob Dylan)
 "I've Got Mine"
 "Statesboro Blues" (Willie McTell)
 "Another Way to Find You"
 "No Expectations" (Mick Jagger, Keith Richards)
 "Friend of the Devil" (John Dawson, Jerry Garcia, Robert Hunter)
 "Don't It Drag On"
 "Every Mother's Son"
 "Mail Order Mystics"
 "I Feel the Same"

Personnel
Chris Smither – vocals, guitar
John Bailey - guitar, autoharp
Rod Hicks - bass
Happy Traum - banjo
Bonnie Raitt - background vocals
Maria Muldaur - background vocals
Kathryn Rose - background vocals
Roy Markowitz - drums
Eric Kaz - piano
Ben Keith - dobro, pedal steel guitar
Stuart Schulman - violin

Production
Produced by Michael Cuscuna
Engineered by Nick Jameson
Milton Glaser - art direction, design
Duane Michals - photography
Bill Wasserzieher - reissue liner notes

References

1972 albums
Chris Smither albums
Albums produced by Michael Cuscuna
Tomato Records albums